Nishantha Muthuhettigamage   is a Sri Lankan politician, a member of the Parliament of Sri Lanka. He belongs to the Sri Lanka Freedom Party. He is the former deputy minister for Ports and Shipping in Sri Lanka.

References

Members of the 14th Parliament of Sri Lanka
Members of the 15th Parliament of Sri Lanka
Sri Lanka Freedom Party politicians
United People's Freedom Alliance politicians
1971 births
Living people
Place of birth missing (living people)
Alumni of Mahinda College
Sinhalese politicians